Thinking Skills and Creativity is a quarterly peer-reviewed academic journal that covers research into the teaching of thinking skills and creativity. The editors-in-chief are Pamela Burnard (University of Cambridge) and Emmanuel Manalo (Kyoto University). The journal was established in 2006 and is published by Elsevier.

Abstracting and indexing
The journal is abstracted and indexed in:
Current Contents/Social & Behavioral Sciences
PsycINFO
Scopus
Social Sciences Citation Index
According to the Journal Citation Reports, the journal has a 2020 impact factor of 3.106.

References

External links
 

Publications established in 2006
Elsevier academic journals
English-language journals
Creativity journals
Education journals
Quarterly journals